India participated in the 2007 Asian Indoor Games held in Macau, China from October 26 to November 3. India finished at 6th place with 9 Gold, 9 Silver and 10 Bronze medals taking Total medals telly to 28.

Medalists

Chess
India won 5 Gold, 2 Silver and 1 Bronze medal in Chess, making it as most productive sport in 2007 Asian Indoor Games for India.

Cue Sports
India won 1 silver and 1 bronze medal in Cue sports. Geet Sethi won silver in English billiards - Singles and Indian Team won Bronze in Snooker team event with Yasin Merchant, Alok Kumar and Manan Chandra as team members.

Indoor athletics
India won 3 Gold, 3 Silver and 4 Bronze medals in Indoor athletics.

Indoor hockey
India won Bronze medal in Indoor hockey. Indian Team defeated  by 7-4 to win Bronze medal.

Kabaddi
India won Gold medal in Kabaddi. In group stages India remains undefeated and faced Pakistan in Finals. In Final, India defeated Pakistan by 35-17.

Muay
India won 1 silver and 3 bronze medals. Sandeep Shukla won silver medal in Middleweight category. Albert Kujur in Flyweight, Mohammed Imaduddin Naveed in Lightweight and Balakrishna Shekhar Shetty in Light middleweight won Bronze medals.

Nations at the 2007 Asian Indoor Games
2007 in Indian sport
India at the Asian Indoor Games